Jay Hickman may refer to:
 Jay Hickman (actor) (born 1973), American voiceover actor
 Jay Hickman (comedian) (1955–1993), American comedian